Antón Cabaleiro (Santiago de Compostela, 1977) is a Spanish visual artist who currently lives in New York City.

Antón Cabaleiro is a PhD in Art, Design and Technology at the Complutense University, Spain. He received his undergraduate Fine Arts Degree from the Faculty of Fine Arts of Pontevedra, Spain (2002), his MFA in Computer Arts from the School of Visual Arts in New York City (2008).  He received a Foundation Barrie de la Maza grant to study in the United States. Other grants and awards include: First Prize in Photography from El Cultural Magazine, Spain; Erasmus programme for European Studies, Germany; and a Foundation Laxeiro Young Artist's Grant, Vigo, Spain.

Cabaleiro's video works explore personal imagery based on the hybridization of different digital techniques. Conceptually, his work focuses on everyday life and the effects of technology and media on the conventional behaviors of the socialized contemporary individual.

He has exhibited extensively throughout Europe and the United States.
Past exhibitions include: MARCO, Museum of Contemporary Art, Vigo, Spain; the CAAC (Andalusian Center of Contemporary Art), Sevilla, Spain; ARCO International Fair of Contemporary Art, Madrid; The Cervantes Institute, Beijing, China and Lisbon, Portugal; Marisa Marimon Gallery, Ourense; Marlborough Gallery, Madrid; Loop International Fair of Video, Barcelona; and the Visual Arts Gallery, New York.

References

External links
 Marisa Marimon Marisa Marimon website
 Anton Cabaleiro on the-artists.org
 http://www.abc.es/hemeroteca/historico-08-02-2006/abc/Galicia/o-marco-de-vigo-amosa-trinta-modos-distintos-de-entender-o-espacio-urban_13271618792.html

1977 births
Living people
School of Visual Arts alumni
New media artists
University of Vigo alumni
Alumni of the Erasmus Programme